Dantan is a village in the Dantan I CD block in the Kharagpur subdivision of the Paschim Medinipur district in the state of West Bengal, India.

Geography

Location

Area overview
Kharagpur subdivision, shown partly in the map alongside, mostly has alluvial soils, except in two CD blocks in the west – Kharagpur I and Keshiary, which mostly have lateritic soils. Around 74% of the total cultivated area is cropped more than once. With a density of population of 787 per km2nearly half of the district’s population resides in this subdivision. 14.33% of the population lives in urban areas and 86.67% lives in the rural areas.

Note: The map alongside presents some of the notable locations in the subdivision. All places marked in the map are linked in the larger full screen map.

Civic administration

CD block HQ
The headquarters of Dantan I CD block are located at Dantan.

Police station
Dantan police station has jurisdiction over Dantan I CD block.

Transport
The Kolkata-Chennai South Eastern Railway passes through Dantan I CD Block and there is a station at Dantan named Dantan railway station.

The Kolkata-Chennai Golden Quadrilateral National Highway 16 or Kolkata-Bengaluru Asian Highway 45 passes through Dantan. Dantan is well connected with Nayagram via Mogalmari Bhasraghat Road.

Education
Bhatter College at Dantan was established in 1963 and is affiliated to Vidyasagar University. It offers undergraduate courses in arts, commerce and science and also has facilities for some post-graduate courses. The college is named after Mathuranath Bhatter, a local businessman and social worker who had contributed handsomely to set up the college.

References

Villages in Paschim Medinipur district